The 12497 / 98 New Delhi–Amritsar Shan-e-Punjab Express is a Superfast Express train belonging to Indian Railways – Northern Railway zone that runs between  and  in India.

It operates as train number 12497 from New Delhi to Amritsar Junction and as train number 12498 in the reverse direction serving the states of Delhi, Haryana and Punjab.

The name Shan-e-Punjab Express translates as the Pride of Punjab.

Coaches

The 12497 / 98 New Delhi–Amritsar Shan-e-Punjab Express has 3 AC Chair Car, 13 2nd Class seating, 2 Unreserved/General & 2 EOG Coaches. It does not carry a pantry car.

As is customary with most train services in India, coach composition may be amended at the discretion of Indian Railways depending on demand.

Service

As the average speed of the train is above , as per Indian Railways rules, its fare includes a Superfast surcharge.

Routeing

The 12497 / 98 New Delhi–Amritsar Shan-e-Punjab Express runs from New Delhi via Ambala Cant Junction,  to Amritsar Junction.

Traction

As the route is fully electrified, a Ghaziabad-based WAP-1 / WAP-5 / WAP-7 locomotive powers the train for its entire journey.

Timings

12497 New Delhi–Amritsar Shan-e-Punjab Express leaves New Delhi on a daily basis at 06:40 hrs IST and reaches Amritsar Junction at 14:20 hrs IST the same day.

12498 Amritsar–New Delhi Shan-e-Punjab Express leaves Amritsar Junction on a daily basis at 15:10 hrs IST and reaches New Delhi at 22:50 hrs IST the same day.

References 

 https://www.youtube.com/watch?v=ZdH0HC-l9No
 http://www.ndtv.com/article/cities/shan-e-punjab-express-s-engine-catches-fire-in-punjab-304193
 https://www.flickr.com/photos/gauravvirdi/8868082205/
 http://archive.indianexpress.com/news/city-shivers-as-it-experiences-first-fog-of-the-season/1208978/

External links

Transport in Amritsar
Transport in Delhi
Named passenger trains of India
Rail transport in Delhi
Rail transport in Haryana
Rail transport in Punjab, India
Express trains in India